Gross Island is a Baffin Island offshore island located in the Arctic Archipelago in the territory of Nunavut. The island lies in Frobisher Bay, south of Potter Island. It is separated from the Lower Savage Islands by the Gabriel Strait. Edgell Island and Resolution Island are to the southeast.

Uninhabited islands of Qikiqtaaluk Region
Islands of Frobisher Bay